Henri Grégoire (Huy, Belgium, 21 March 1881 – 28 September 1964, Brussels, Belgium) was an eminent scholar of the Byzantine Empire, virtually the founder of Byzantine studies in Belgium.

Grégoire spent most of his teaching career at the Université libre de Bruxelles.  In 1938, he taught at the New School for Social Research and during the Second World War, joined the École libre des hautes études at the New School.

He was the editor of four journals—Byzantion, Nouvelle Clio, Annuaire de l'Institut de Philologie et d'Histoire Orientales et Slaves, and Flambeau—and published prolifically: by 1953 he had 575 titles in his bibliography.

Grégoire is especially remembered for his work on medieval epic poetry, notably Digenis Akritas.

References
 "Henri Grégoire" (memorial note), Speculum 41:3:594-602 (July 1966) at JSTOR

Belgian Byzantinists
20th-century Belgian historians
1881 births
1964 deaths
People from Huy
Belgian medievalists
Scholars of Byzantine history